Nabit (Nabt), or Nabdem (also Nabde, Nabte, Nabdam, Nabdug, Nabrug, Nabnam, Namnam), is a Gur language of Burkina Faso and Ghana.

The proposal to create an ISO 639-3 code was rejected in January 2017.

References

Oti–Volta languages
Languages of Ghana
Languages of Burkina Faso
Articles citing ISO change requests